Killing Angels is an album by Swedish band Nine.

Track listing
All tracks by Nine.

 "Inferno" – 3:22
 "Euthanasia" – 3:07
 "Watching the Train Go By" – 3:23
 "The Strategy of Fear" – 3:22
 "Discontent O.D." – 3:37
 "The End" – 3:10
 "Anxiety Report" – 5:53
 "Cardiac Arrest" – 4:16
 "33" – 3:42
 "Them" – 4:40

Personnel 

Jacob Bannon – art direction, design
Daniel Bergstrand – producer, engineer, mixing
Robert Karlsson – bass, group member
Orjan Ornkloo – guitar, engineer
L.G. Petrov – guest vocals
Andreas Pettersson Trio – logo

References

Nine (band) albums
2004 albums
Deathwish Inc. albums
Albums with cover art by Jacob Bannon